Tetradactylus ellenbergeri, commonly known as Ellen's whip lizard and Ellenberger's long-tailed seps, is a species of lizard in the family Gerrhosauridae. The species is indigenous to Africa.

Etymology
The specific name, ellenbergeri, is in honor of Victor Ellenberger (1879–1972), who was an African-born Swiss missionary and naturalist.

Geographic range
T. ellenbergeri is found in Angola, Democratic Republic of the Congo, Tanzania, and Zambia.

Habitat
The preferred natural habitats of T. ellenbergeri are savanna and grassland.

Description
T. ellenbergeri is a snake-like lizard. Its front legs are absent, and its back legs are reduced to minute spikes about 2 mm long. The tail is extremely long, more than three times the snout-to-vent length (SVL).

Behavior
T. ellenbergeri is terrestrial and diurnal.

Diet
T. ellenbergeri preys upon insects and other invertebrates.

Reproduction
T. ellenbergeri is oviparous.

References

Further reading
Angel F (1922). "Sur un Lézard d'un genre nouveau de la famille des Gerrhosauridæ". Bulletin du Muséum d'Histoire Naturelle 28: 150–152. (Paratetradactylus ellenbergeri, new species). (in French).
Branch, Bill (2004). Field Guide to Snakes and other Reptiles of Southern Africa. Third Revised edition, Second impression. Sanibel Island, Florida: Ralph Curtis Books. 399 pp. . (Tetradactylus ellenbergeri, pp. 181–182).
Spawls S, Howell K, Hinkel H, Menegon M (2018). Field Guide to East African Reptiles, Second Edition. London: Bloomsbury Natural History. 624 pp. . (Tetradactylus ellenbergeri, p. 218).

Tetradactylus
Reptiles described in 1922
Taxa named by Fernand Angel